Ever After is Japanese singer songwriter Fayray's second studio and first self-produced album. The album was released on September 6, 2000.

Track listing

Charts and sales

References

External links

2000 albums
Fayray albums